Orland is a hamlet in the Canadian province of Saskatchewan located in Hillsborough No. 132.

See also
 List of communities in Saskatchewan
 Hamlets of Saskatchewan

Hillsborough No. 132, Saskatchewan